Bulley is a hamlet in the Forest of Dean, Gloucestershire, England.

Bulley may also refer to:

Surname
Arthur Bulley (1861–1942), British cotton merchant and gardener
Agnes Lois Bulley (1901-1995), British county councillor, political activist and philanthropist
Cyril Bulley (1907–1989), Church of England bishop
Frederick Bulley (1810–1885), President of Magdalen College, Oxford, UK
Nicola Bulley, British woman who disappeared in 2023; see Disappearance of Nicola Bulley
Rebecca Bulley (born 1982), Australian netball player
Ted Bulley (born 1955), Canadian ice hockey player
Victoria Adukwei Bulley ( 2023), Ghanaian-British poet

Business
Bulley & Andrews, a building contractor in Chicago

See also
Bully (disambiguation)